Trachycystis placenta is a species of very small, air-breathing, land snail, a terrestrial pulmonate gastropod mollusk in the family Charopidae.

This species is endemic to South Africa. Its natural habitat is subtropical or tropical, moist lowland forests. It is threatened by habitat loss.

References

Endemic fauna of South Africa
Charopidae
Gastropods described in 1899
Taxonomy articles created by Polbot